Palterton and Sutton is a former railway station between Palterton and Sutton Scarsdale, Derbyshire, England.

Context

The station was built by the Midland Railway on the circuitous Barrow Hill to Pleasley West line known as the Doe Lea Branch, because it ran for much of its length along the valley of the River Doe Lea.

History
The station was opened without ceremony on 1 September 1890 as "Palterton and Sutton". It initially provided a service of three trains each way between Mansfield and Chesterfield, taking about an hour from end to end.

The line was single track between Seymour Junction and Pleasley West. Accordingly, the station had a single platform.

Normal passenger traffic along the Doe Lea Branch dwindled over the years and finally ceased on 28 July 1930. The last steam train to use the line was an enthusiasts' special on 16 October 1965. This train also traversed the Clowne Branch.

When Glapwell Colliery closed in 1974 the line South of Bolsover Castle station became redundant, though it was not lifted until 1978. The station has been demolished.

The trackbed through the station South from Bolsover Castle through the site of Palterton and Sutton station to the bottom of Rylah Hill between Palterton and M1 J29 is now a public bridleway known as The Stockley Trail.

References

Sources

Further reading

External links
Palterton & Sutton station: old O.S. Map via npemaps
The station on overlain OS maps National Library of Scotland
The station and line on overlain OS maps Rail Map Online
The station, line and mileages Railway Codes
The station's history Old Miner

Disused railway stations in Derbyshire
Former Midland Railway stations
Railway stations in Great Britain opened in 1890
Railway stations in Great Britain closed in 1930